The Eping River is a tributary of the Kamarang River in Region 8 of Guyana.

The area is a part of the Roraima Basin, which is an area rich in gold deposits and has been extensively mined.

Eping Landing is a small settlement along the river. The river runs by Mt. Raschaxe a tepui in the Merume mountain range.

Plants first collected in the surrounding area include psychotria sandwithiana (a flowering plant), rhynchocladium stayermarkii, compsoneura ulei (tree).

See also
List of rivers of Guyana
Mining in Guyana

References

Bibliography 
Rand McNally, The New International Atlas, 1993.

Rivers of Guyana